Ira Barnes Hyde (January 18, 1838 – December 6, 1926) was a Representative from Missouri. He was a Republican.

Hyde was born in Guilford, New York in 1838. He served in the army during the Civil War, and was a representative between 1873 and 1875. He ran for reelection but lost. He died in Princeton, Missouri in 1926.

His sons have also been involved in politics. Arthur M. Hyde was a Governor of Missouri. Laurance M. Hyde was a chief justice of the Missouri Supreme Court.

External links

1838 births
1926 deaths
Republican Party members of the United States House of Representatives from Missouri
People from Guilford, New York
People from Princeton, Missouri